Akasan Choseichi Dam is a gravity dam located in Gunma Prefecture in Japan. The dam is used for power production. The catchment area of the dam is 55.6 km2. The dam impounds about 2  ha of land when full and can store 26 thousand cubic meters of water. The construction of the dam was started on 1958 and completed in 1961.

References

Dams in Gunma Prefecture